The Woodland Automobile Display is a museum in Paso Robles, California, which showcases vintage, classic, and historic vehicles.  The museum's primary focus is racing vehicles, with a concentration of Sprint, Modified, Super Modified and Midget race cars.  The Woodland Auto Display is located on the grounds of  the Estrella Warbird Museum at the Paso Robles Municipal Airport in central California.

History
Another  of restoration shop is located off site.

Collection

Most of the vehicles on display have been restored to the original condition as when first built. Some of the cars came off the track and required little to no restoration, while some were restored to pristine condition after being rolled, wrecked, worn out or demolished. The collection also includes numerous well known vintage and classic automobiles, along with preserved historical motorcycles. The collection includes a Mercedes Benz 300 Gull Wing, a Jaguar XKE Roadster, 1932 Ford Roadster (serial # 00007), a 1932 Ford Victoria, the 2005 Ford GT 500 and a 1948 Mercury Coupe.

References

Museums in San Luis Obispo County, California
Buildings and structures in Paso Robles, California
Automobile museums in California